Aqrakamani was a Nubian king who ruled most likely between 29 and 25 BC. He is only known from a Demotic inscription at Dakka. The date of the inscription and therefore the date of the king are disputed, but it seems most likely that the inscription was written when the Triacontaschoenus (parts of Lower Nubia, where the temple of Dakka is standing) was under Meroetic rule. The Demotic text mentions the third regnal year of the king. The text also mentions his mother, the queen (t3 pr-ˁ3t) Naytal.

References 

1st-century BC monarchs of Kush
1st-century BC rulers